JB or J.B. may refer to:

Literature 
 J.B. (play), a 1958 play by Archibald MacLeish in verse, based on the Book of Job
 Jerusalem Bible, a 1966 Roman Catholic Bible translation

People
 BlocBoy JB (born 1996), American rapper
 JB (Swedish musician), Swedish musician
 Jaffar Byn, Swedish rapper known as JB
 JB (Canadian rapper), Canadian male rapper
 JB (South Korean singer) (born 1994), South Korean musician
 J. B. Smoove (born 1965), American actor and comedian
Joe Biden (born 1942), president of the United States
Justin Bieber (born 1994), Canadian singer

Technology and engineering 
 British Rail Class 73 locomotives
 Jungfraubahn, a rack railway

Other uses 
 Johor Bahru, a city in Malaysia
 J&B RARE Whisky, by Justerini & Brooks
 JB Hi-Fi,  Australia
 JB Catalogue of Malta Stamps and Postal History
 Jornal do Brasil, a newspaper
 Junior branch, members of CISV aged 11-25
 Helijet (IATA code JB)

See also
 
 
 
 JB's (disambiguation)